"Good Wife, Wise Mother" is a phrase representing a traditional ideal for womanhood in East Asia, including Japan, China and Korea. First appearing in the late 1800s, the four-character phrase "Good Wife, Wise Mother" (also ) was coined by Nakamura Masanao in 1875.

During the late 1800s, women in East Asian society were expected to master domestic skills such as sewing and cooking, and to develop the moral and intellectual skills to raise strong, intelligent sons for the sake of the nation. Childbearing was considered a "patriotic duty", and although this philosophy declined in Japan after World War II, feminist historians have argued it existed there as recently as the 1980s.

This traditional view of women was similarly shared in Chinese society throughout the early 1900s, and on numerous occasions was criticized by Chinese academics such as Lu Xun and Zhu Ziqing. The phrase, and its related effects and ideals, influenced and continue to influence traditional views of women in East Asian societies to the modern day.

China 
Traditionally in Chinese feudal society, a wife must consider her husband's family more important than her own. This sentiment is prevalent to this day, particularly in rural areas. The relationship between mother-in-law and daughter-in-law and the relationship between father and son is more important than the relationship between husband and wife. A wife must always be submissive to her husband, and she can neither be offensive nor jealous. The husband has duties outside of the home and the wife has duties inside, and they do not interfere with the tasks of each other. To fulfill the role of "good wife, wise mother," the woman must educate her children accordingly. Since Chinese families puts emphasis on prosperity, a wife should also not only be fertile, she need to produce sons and educate them so that they can succeed in society.

Japan
The phrase "good wife, wise mother" appeared in the latter part of the Meiji period in the late 19th century. During World War II it was taught to promote conservative, nationalistic, and militaristic state policies and to help a developing capitalistic economy. From the late 1890s to the end of World War II, the phrase became increasingly prevalent in mass media and higher levels of public and private girl's schools. During the 1890s, "good wife and wise mother" was taught only in the higher levels where elite, upper-class girls attended. It was introduced to elementary schools’ curriculum when the 1911 revision of the ethics textbooks came out.

Women were taught to fulfill this role due to nationalism. The Empire wanted to prevent Western invasion. While Western countries were making improvements in women's social rights, such as suffrage, Japan was just beginning to confront women's movements. Japan tried to establish the woman's role and control new social movements through regularized education and prohibiting social and political rights.

Usage 
Currently, the phrase has conflicting meanings. While some people use it to refer to a woman having good motherly and wife characters, many others use it to criticize prejudice against women.

Criticism 
For feminists, the idea of "Good Wife, Wise Mother" disguises the real intention of denial of women's equity in education, profession, and marriage.

See also 
 Barefoot and pregnant
Bluestocking (magazine)
 Kinder, Küche, Kirche
 Proverbs 31
 Shōjo
 Three Obediences and Four Virtues
 Women in Japan
 Women in China
 Women in Taiwan
 Women in South Korea
 Yamato nadeshiko

References

Further reading 
 小山静子、『良妻賢母という規範』、東京：勁草書房、1991.
 小山静子、『家庭の生成と女性の国民化』、東京：勁草書房、1999.
 Making Village Women into "Good Wives and Wise Mothers" in Prewar Japan

Natalism
Japanese nationalism
Society of Japan
Japanese words and phrases
Patriotism
Women in Japan
Women in China